Ulmus parvifolia 'True Green' is a cultivar of Chinese elm. It features a graceful, rounded head of small deep-green glossy leaves. It is evergreen in the lower south of the United States. It is hardy to Zone 7.

Synonymy
Ulmus parvifolia subsp. sempervirens 'True Green'

References

Chinese elm cultivar
Ulmus articles missing images
Ulmus